The Railleuse was an 18-gun frigate of the French Navy, launched in 1689.

Career
Under Captain Jean Bart, Railleuse ferried François Louis, Prince of Conti to Poland, departing Dunkirk on 6 September 1697 and reaching Gdańsk on the 20th. She then returned him to France on 11 December.

She was destroyed by fire on 5 August 1703, along with Joyeuse, when three English ships of the line attacked the convoy that she was escorting.

References

Citations

Bibliography 
 

1680s ships
Age of Sail frigates of France
Ships built in France
Frigates of the French Navy